Asclera ruficollis, the red-necked false blister beetle, is a species of false blister beetle in the family Oedemeridae. It is found in North America.

References

 Arnett, Ross H. Jr. (1983). "Family 119. Oedemeridae, The False Blister Beetles". Checklist of the Beetles of North and Central America and the West Indies, 6.

Further reading

 NCBI Taxonomy Browser, Asclera ruficollis
 Arnett, R.H. Jr., M. C. Thomas, P. E. Skelley and J. H. Frank. (eds.). (2002). American Beetles, Volume II: Polyphaga: Scarabaeoidea through Curculionoidea. CRC Press LLC, Boca Raton, FL.
 Arnett, Ross H. (2000). American Insects: A Handbook of the Insects of America North of Mexico. CRC Press.
 Richard E. White. (1983). Peterson Field Guides: Beetles. Houghton Mifflin Company.

Oedemeridae
Beetles described in 1823